The Chempil Thailamparambil Anantha Padmanabhan Valiya Arayan Kankumaran, known as Chempil Arayan, was the Admiral of the Travancore Navy in the service of Avittam Thirunal Balarama Varma, King of Travancore.  He was born at Chempu, near Vaikom, in Kottayam, Kerala, India. He belong to the Koli caste of Kerala. Chempil Arayan is recognised as first freedom fighter of South India.

Chempil Arayan was involved in the Travancore War under the command of  Velu Thampi Dalawa in 1809; among other things he led an attack on Bolghatty Palace, the residence of the then Company Resident, Colin Macaulay. The Resident escaped narrowly with his life, eluding the attackers through a tunnel and fleeing in a small boat. The Arayan was later captured, and freed after the payment of a ransom; he died in battle against the forces of the Company.

Chempil Arayan was well known for his naval exploits using the traditional Kerala boat known as the "Odi Vallam". Chempil Arayan's Nalukettu (Ancestral home) known as Thailamparampil House is in Chempu, Vaikom. The family members have preserved the Nalukettu and all the old artefacts used by Mr. Arayan including his sword and stone statue. Chempil Arayan's tomb is situated next to his ancestral home.

References 

Year of birth missing
Koli people
Indian warriors
Indian military personnel killed in action
Indian revolutionaries
Revolutionary movement for Indian independence
Indian independence activists from Kerala
People of the Kingdom of Travancore
Indian military leaders
Naval history of India
Admirals
People from Kottayam district
Military personnel from Kerala
19th-century Indian people